Kassi may refer to:

People
Kassi (empress) (fl. 1341), empress of Mali
Kassi Akesse Mathias (born 1986), Ivorian footballer
Kassi Manlan (1947–2001), Ivorian diplomat
Luc Kassi (born 1994), Ivorian footballer
Lucien Kassi-Kouadio (born 1963), Ivorian footballer
Norma Kassi (born 1954), Canadian politician
Thierry Kassi (born 2000), Ivorian footballer

Other uses
Kassi, Viljandi County, Estonia
Kassi, Võru County, Estonia

See also
Kasi (Pashtun tribe), in Pakistan
Kasi (disambiguation)
Kassie (disambiguation)
Kassis (disambiguation)
Cassi (disambiguation)